The 2021 J&T Banka Ostrava Open was a WTA tournament organised for female professional tennis players on indoor hard courts. It was the 2nd edition of the event on the 2021 WTA Tour, primarily organised due to the cancellation of the Asian tournaments during the 2021 season, because of the ongoing COVID-19 pandemic. The event took place at the Ostrava Arena in Ostrava, Czech Republic, from 20 through 26 September 2021.

Champions

Singles

  Anett Kontaveit def.  Maria Sakkari, 6–2, 7–5

Doubles

  Sania Mirza /  Zhang Shuai def.  Kaitlyn Christian /  Erin Routliffe 6–3, 6–2

Singles main draw entrants

Seeds

 Rankings are as of September 13, 2021.

Other entrants
The following players received wildcards into the singles main draw:
  Caroline Garcia
  Tereza Martincová
  Jeļena Ostapenko
  Kateřina Siniaková

The following players received entry from the qualifying draw:
  Océane Dodin
  Fiona Ferro
  Ana Konjuh
  Magda Linette
  Anastasia Potapova
  Anastasia Zakharova

The following players received entry as lucky losers:
  Anna Blinkova 
  Varvara Gracheva

Withdrawals
Before the tournament
  Barbora Krejčíková → replaced by  Zhang Shuai
  Elise Mertens → replaced by  Varvara Gracheva
  Petra Martić → replaced by  Sara Sorribes Tormo
  Karolína Muchová → replaced by  Anna Blinkova
  Karolína Plíšková → replaced by  Jil Teichmann
  Elina Svitolina → replaced by  Sorana Cîrstea

Doubles main draw entrants

Seeds 

 1 Rankings as of September 13, 2021.

Withdrawals
Before the tournament
  Ekaterina Alexandrova /  Stefanie Vögele → replaced by  Rutuja Bhosale /  Emily Webley-Smith
  Natela Dzalamidze /  Kamilla Rakhimova → replaced by  Natela Dzalamidze /  Yana Sizikova

References

External links

Ostrava Open
Ostrava Open
Ostrava Open
Ostrava Open